Michio (written: 道夫, 道雄, 道郎, 通夫 or 三知男) is a masculine Japanese given name. Notable people with the name include:

, Japanese shogi player
, Japanese dancer and choreographer
Michio Kaku (born 1947), American theoretical physicist, futurist and writer
, Japanese Nordic combined skier
, Japanese classical composer and conductor
Michio Mamiya, Japanese composer, pianist, harpsichordist, and conductor of baroque and classical music
, Japanese musician
, Japanese economist and emeritus professor of LSE
, Japanese businessman, inventor and founder of the Suzuki Motor Corporation
, Japanese mathematician
, Japanese shogi player

Fictional characters
Michio Suzuki, a main character from manga Ultra B
Michio Yuki, the antagonist of manga series MW

See also
Mishio (disambiguation)

Japanese masculine given names